Aşağı Qapanlı, Qapanlı (?-2015) is a village in the municipality of Azad Qaraqoyunlu in the Tartar Rayon of Azerbaijan.

References

Populated places in Tartar District